The Hoehn and Yahr scale is a commonly used system for describing how the symptoms of Parkinson's disease progress. It was originally published in 1967 in the journal Neurology by Margaret Hoehn and Melvin Yahr and included stages 1 through 5. Since then, a modified Hoehn and Yahr scale was proposed with the addition of stages 1.5 and 2.5 to help describe the intermediate course of the disease. It has been shown that HY stage discrimination can be automated, even with patients who cannot support themselves. 

This rating system has been largely supplanted by the Unified Parkinson's Disease Rating Scale, which assesses limitation of daily activities and non-motor symptoms in more detail.

Time between stages 

A 2010 study of 695 patients (mean age: 65.2, male: 57.3%) found the median time taken to transit H&Y stages as shown below:

References

Parkinson's disease
Medical scales